Susannah Montgomery is a British diplomat who was the British Ambassador to Slovakia (2011–2013) and High Commissioner to Gambia (2008–2009).. She was the Acting High Commissioner.

Montgomery was in Slovakia during the Velvet revolution and when the UK hosted the Olympic Games. In April 2012 she had the honour of carrying the Olympic Torch as it passed through the capital as part of the Bratislava Marathon.

Personal life
Montgomery married Andrew James in 2011.

References

Ambassadors and High Commissioners of the United Kingdom to the Gambia
British women ambassadors
Ambassadors of the United Kingdom to Slovakia
Year of birth missing (living people)
Living people